Jackie Elliott Hayes (born October 12, 1961) is an American politician. He is a member of the South Carolina House of Representatives from the 55th District, serving since 1999. He is a member of the Democratic party. He is also known as Coach Hayes from his career as a football coach.

Background 

Hayes was born in Marion, SC and worked as a coach at Dillon High School since the 1990s. In 1998 he has elected to the South Carolina House of Representatives succeeding Marion Hardy Kinon.

In the legislature 

Hayes currently serves on the House Ways and Means committee. In 2022 while on this committee he was the only democrat to vote for a bill that restricted access to abortion with no exception for rape or incest.

Political positions

Electoral history

References

Living people
1961 births
Democratic Party members of the South Carolina House of Representatives
21st-century American politicians
People from Marion, South Carolina
People from Dillon, South Carolina